Julie Tilsner is an American author of humor books dealing with themes of women's experiences, children, and family. Her books have been published by McGraw-Hill, Bantam Books, NTC Publishing Group, and Ten Speed Press. Tilsner is also a journalist, and was on the staff of BusinessWeek. Since 2014, Tilsner has been at USC and as of 2022 is senior editor for the USC Marshall School of Business's marketing and communications team.

Biography
Tilsner was born in Southern California, obtainined a degree in journalism from San Jose State University.  She graduated from Columbia University Graduate School of Journalism in 1992.

Published works
29 and Counting (A Chick's Guide to Turning 30) (1998)
Planet Parenthood (2001)
Attack of the Toddlers (2001)
Mommy Yoga: The 50 Stretches of Motherhood (2005)

References

External links

Living people
American humorists
San Jose State University alumni
Year of birth missing (living people)
21st-century American journalists
American women journalists
21st-century American women